Frank Joseph Pallone Jr. (born October 30, 1951) is an American lawyer and politician serving as the U.S. representative for , serving since 1988.  He is a member of the Democratic Party. The district, numbered as the 3rd district from 1988 to 1993, is in the north-central part of the state and includes New Brunswick, Woodbridge Township, Perth Amboy, Sayreville, Edison, Piscataway and Asbury Park. Pallone is the ranking member of the House Energy and Commerce Committee.

Early life, education, and early political career
Pallone is a graduate of Middlebury College, The Fletcher School of Law and Diplomacy at Tufts University, and Rutgers School of Law–Camden. Before being elected to the House, he was a member of the Long Branch city council from 1982 to 1988.

Pallone was a member of the New Jersey Senate from the 11th district from 1984 to 1988. In 1983, he defeated incumbent Republican State Senator Brian T. Kennedy 50%-49%. In 1987, he was reelected with 60% of the vote, defeating Councilwoman Gerri C. Popkin of Neptune City.

U.S. House of Representatives

Elections
1988–1990
In March 1988, 60-year-old incumbent U.S. Congressman James Howard of New Jersey's 3rd congressional district died in office. In November, the regular election coincided with a special election to complete Howard's term; Pallone won both, defeating Republican former state Assemblyman Joe Azzolina 52% to 47% and Libertarian Laura Stewart. In 1990, he was reelected with 49% of the vote, against a Republican, an independent, Libertarian Bill Stewart, and a Populist.

1992–2008
After redistricting, Pallone's district was renumbered the 6th district. In the 1992 Democratic primary, he defeated State Representative Robert Smith 55% to 37%. In the general election, he defeated Republican State Senator Joe Kyrillos 52% to 45% and nine other candidates. Since then, he has won reelection with at least 60% in all but two elections (1998 and 2010). In 1998, he defeated Republican teacher Mike Ferguson 57% to 40%.

2010

Pallone was challenged by Republican nominee Anna C. Little, a former Monmouth County Freeholder and mayor of Highlands, New Jersey, who is an attorney specializing in immigration law. On November 3, 2010, Pallone defeated Little by over 16,000 votes, 55% to 43%, in what analysts considered a terrible year for Democrats. For the first time in his career, Pallone failed to carry his home county of Monmouth.

Tenure
Pallone is a Progressive Caucus Member. He serves as Vice Chairman of the Native American Caucus, where he has worked on a bipartisan basis to protect the inherent sovereignty of tribal governments and promote the needs of Indian Country. As a senior member of the House Resources Committee—the committee with jurisdiction over all matters regarding U.S. relations with American Indians and Alaska Natives—he has been a defender of the sovereign status of Indian Tribal governments as independent from the United States.

He also serves as a co-chairman of the Congressional Caucus on Armenian Issues along with Congressman Ed Royce (previously Joe Knollenberg and Mark Kirk) and was instrumental in garnering the support of 127 members (30%) of the U.S. House for the Armenian Caucus. In 2002 he was awarded the Mkhitar Gosh Medal by the President of Armenia.

In 2002, Pallone was awarded India's third highest civilian award, the Padma Bhushan, for his contributions as member of Congress's India Caucus. He also received the Friends of India Bollywood Movie Award in 2003.

Pallone was one of 31 House Democrats who voted not to count Ohio's electoral votes in the 2004 presidential election. Republican President George W. Bush won Ohio by 118,457 votes. Without Ohio's electoral votes, the election would have been decided by the U.S. House of Representatives, with each state having one vote in accordance with the Twelfth Amendment to the United States Constitution.

Pallone received an A on the Drum Major Institute's 2005 Congressional Scorecard on middle-class issues. while the National Taxpayers Union has consistently given Pallone an F ranking on votes that affect taxes, spending, and debt.

Pallone has questioned the Federal Emergency Management Agency (FEMA) on its update of flood plain maps in Monmouth County, specifically in the Bayshore area.

Pallone has introduced a bill to modify the Magnuson-Stevens Fishery Conservation and Management Act, the U.S.'s most important set of fisheries regulations.

On October 3, 2008, Pallone voted for the Troubled Asset Relief Program believing that the enumerated powers grant Congress the authority to "purchase assets and equity from financial institutions in order to strengthen its financial sector."

In 2014, Pallone defeated Representative Anna Eshoo 100 to 90 in a secret-ballot vote to becoming the ranking member of the Committee on Energy and Commerce. He had been the third-ranking Democrat, and was in line to becoming ranking member after the 2014 midterm elections due to the retirements of John Dingell and Henry Waxman. Pallone was backed by Minority Whip Steny Hoyer and the Congressional Black Caucus, the latter of which "made a repeated point to stress the importance of Pallone’s seniority. Black lawmakers have a deep appreciation for seniority, as it was historically the quickest way African-American members earned gavels". House Minority Leader Nancy Pelosi aggressively campaigned on Eshoo's behalf, while the Steering Committee, packed with Pelosi allies, recommended Eshoo for the ranking slot by 30 to 19 votes.

After Representative Chris Smith said he did "not construe homosexual rights as human rights", Pallone issued a statement supporting homosexual rights. The statement read, in part, "Representatives in Congress must be promoting the expansion of human rights, not fighting to limit its definition to people that they deem to be appropriate."

Syria
In 2023, Pallone was among 56 Democrats and the only representative from New Jersey to vote in favor of H.Con.Res. 21 which directed President Joe Biden to remove U.S. troops from Syria within 180 days.

Legislation
Pallone opposed the Gabriella Miller Kids First Research Act (H.R. 2019; 113th Congress), which passed in both the House and the Senate. The bill would end taxpayer contributions to the Presidential Election Campaign Fund and divert the money in that fund to pay for research into pediatric cancer through the National Institutes of Health. The total funding for research would come to $126 million over 10 years. As of 2014, the national conventions got about 23% of their funding from the Presidential Election Campaign Fund. Pallone said the bill was "a disingenuous and empty attempt by the Republicans to divert attention from the fact that they have voted to cut research time and time again." Democratic opponents blamed Republicans for $1.5 billion cuts to the National Institutes of Health and said this money would not make it up. Supporters of the bill argued that the use of this money for pediatric cancer research was better than using it for political campaigns, so the bill should be supported for that reason. Pallone was one of 58 members of Congress to oppose tabling a motion offering articles of impeachment against Donald Trump on December 6, 2017.

While chair of the House Energy and Commerce Committee, Pallone sponsored the American Data Privacy and Protection Act (ADPPA), which became the first online privacy bill to pass committee markup.

Committee assignments

Committee on Energy and Commerce (ranking member)
Subcommittee on Communications and Technology
Subcommittee on Environment and Economy
Subcommittee on Health (Former Ranking Member)

Caucus memberships
Congressional Boating Caucus
Congressional Coastal Caucus (Co-Chair)
Congressional Progressive Caucus
Congressional Steel Caucus
United States Congressional International Conservation Caucus
Congressional Arts Caucus
Congressional Armenian Caucus (Co-Chair)
House Baltic Caucus 
Congressional NextGen 9-1-1 Caucus

Party leadership
Communications Chair of the Democratic Policy Committee

Other political offices
In 2002, Pallone turned down an offer to replace embattled Senator Bob Torricelli as the Democratic nominee for U.S. Senate by Democratic Party leaders. The slot eventually went to Frank Lautenberg, who won the general election. In 2004-05, Pallone considered a gubernatorial bid against embattled and unpopular Governor Jim McGreevey, but ended up supporting eventual nominee Jon Corzine.

Early in 2005, Pallone announced his intention to seek the Senate seat held at the time by Corzine. Corzine won the Democratic nomination for governor in June 2005, and Pallone was the first politician to officially seek Corzine's Senate seat. He launched "Pallone for New Jersey" to inform New Jersey citizens of his work in the House and his desire to be New Jersey's next senator. In January 2006, Pallone announced his endorsement of Bob Menendez for Senate in the November 2006 election, ending his bid for the seat.

Pallone was an early and strong endorser of Hillary Clinton in the 2008 Democratic presidential primaries. He traveled to New Hampshire to campaign for Clinton. Clinton lost the primary to Barack Obama, who went on to become president. Pallone also endorsed Frank Lautenberg over Congressman Rob Andrews.

2013 U.S. Senate election

On January 3, 2013, it was revealed that Pallone was considering another bid for the Senate should Frank Lautenberg elect not to pursue another term in office in 2014. On June 9, 2013, Pallone said he was officially in the race to fill Lautenberg's Senate seat, due to the Lautenberg's death, and could win the Democratic primary against Newark Mayor Cory Booker by running on his progressive congressional record. Lautenberg's family endorsed Pallone on July 8, 2013. The state council of sheet metal workers also endorsed Pallone.

In the August 13, 2013 primary election, Pallone lost to Booker. Booker then won the general election.

Electoral history

Personal life
Pallone lives with his wife Sarah Hospodor-Pallone and their three children in Long Branch, New Jersey. They married in August 1992. Pallone is a Roman Catholic.

References

External links

Congressman Frank Pallone, Jr. official U.S. House website
Frank Pallone for Congress

|-

|-

1951 births
21st-century American politicians
Living people
American Roman Catholics
Catholics from New Jersey
Middlebury College alumni
New Jersey city council members
Democratic Party members of the United States House of Representatives from New Jersey
New Jersey lawyers
Democratic Party New Jersey state senators
Politicians from Long Branch, New Jersey
Recipients of the Padma Bhushan in public affairs
Rutgers School of Law–Camden alumni
The Fletcher School at Tufts University alumni
American people of Italian descent